Enneapogon elegans is a species of plant in the grass family. It is found in Burma and Tamil Nadu, India.

References

External links
 Enneapogon elegans at Tropicos

elegans
Plants described in 1907
Flora of Myanmar
Flora of Tamil Nadu